Yahyaabad (also Romanized as Yaḩyáābād; also known as Eḩyā’ābād, Ehyābād, and Yaḩyāābād-e Bozorg) is a village in Kahruyeh Rural District, in the Central District of Shahreza County, Isfahan Province, Iran. At the 2006 census, its population was 83, in 26 families.

References 

Populated places in Shahreza County